Anolis neglectus, the Serra dos Órgãos anole, is a species of lizard in the family Dactyloidae. The species is found in Brazil.

References

Anoles
Reptiles described in 2019
Endemic fauna of Brazil
Reptiles of Brazil
Taxa named by Miguel Trefaut Rodrigues
Taxa named by William W. Lamar